Zephyrogomphus is a genus of dragonflies in the family Gomphidae. 
The species are medium-sized and dark brown with dull markings. They are commonly known as hunters. The two species of Zephyrogomphus are found on opposite sides of the Australian continent - in south-western Australia and north-eastern Queensland.

Species
The genus Zephyrogomphus includes two species:
 Zephyrogomphus lateralis  - lilac hunter
 Zephyrogomphus longipositor  - rainforest hunter

See also
 List of Odonata species of Australia

References

Gomphidae
Anisoptera genera
Odonata of Australia
Endemic fauna of Australia
Taxa named by J.A.L. (Tony) Watson
Insects described in 1991